Watermouth is a sheltered bay and hamlet between Hele Bay and Combe Martin on the North Devon coast of England. The settlement's castle, named as Watermouth Castle, is currently used being as a theme park.  Watermouth harbour is shielded by the natural breakwater of Sexton's Burrows. Watermouth Valley Camping Park can be found in Watermouth.

References

External links
Watermouth castle
Information on watermouth cove

Hamlets in Devon